PGS (Petroleum Geo-Services) is a technologically focused oilfield service company involved in providing geophysical services worldwide. Its seismic service offerings help oil companies find oil and gas reserves offshore. Product offerings span from survey planning and data acquisition, through advanced imaging, to reservoir analysis and interpretation.

PGS was founded in Norway in 1991. The company currently has:

8 offshore seismic vessels (6 active in winter season)
1 processing and imaging megacenters
3 main offices Oslo, London and Houston, plus a network of local offices employing around 60 nationalities

PGS has a presence in over 10 countries with headquarters in Oslo, Norway. The company was headquartered at Lysaker until 2013 when it moved to nearby Lilleaker. PGS shares are listed on the Oslo Stock Exchange (OSE:PGS).

References

External links

Oil companies of Norway
Oilfield services companies
Non-renewable resource companies established in 1991
Companies listed on the Oslo Stock Exchange
Companies based in Bærum
Companies based in Oslo
Norwegian companies established in 1991